Ischasia linsleyi is a species of beetle in the family Cerambycidae. It was described by Giesbert in 1996.

References

Rhinotragini
Beetles described in 1996